Acacia truncata, commonly known as the angle leaved wattle or west coast wattle, is a coastal shrub in the family Fabaceae, with a native distribution along the southwest coast of Western Australia.  A specimen of this wattle was part of an early European botanical collection, perhaps the first from Australia.

Description
It has ribbed and glabrous branchlets. The shiny brown seeds are longitudinally arranged in the pod.
Like many other Acacia species, A. truncata has phyllodes rather than true leaves.

Taxonomy
The species was initially described as Adiantum truncatum by Nicolaas Laurens Burman in 1768 in the work Flora Indica: cu accedit series zoophytorum indicorum, nec non Prodromus Florae Capensis.

It was first formally described as Acacia truncata by the botanist Johann Centurius Hoffmannsegg in 1824 as part of the work Verzeichniss der Pflanzenkulturen in der Gräflich Hoffmannseggischen Garten zu Dresden und Rammenau.

The name Acacia decipiens R.Br.is regarded as a synonym for this taxon.
In 2003 it was reclassified as Racosperma truncatum by Leslie Pedley, then transferred back to the genus Acacia in 2016.

The species is closely related to and similar in appearance to Acacia littorea.

The species name is taken from the Latin word meaning to cut off, referring to the short blunt end of the phyllodes.

Distribution
A. truncata is found along the west coast of Western Australia extending from the Mid West through the Wheatbelt and Peel and into the South West. It is found as far north as Carnamah and as far south as Harvey. It grows in sandy and skeletal soils and is found among sand dunes and patches of coastal limestone as part of coastal heath communities.

Cultivation and Uses
The plant commercially available as seedlings in seed form. It is easily propagated from seed collected in December or January. The seeds need to be treated with hot water treatment or lightly scarified prior to planting. It grows best in a free-draining seed-raising soil mix. 
The species is used for restoration work, particularly in coastal areas, in mixed plantings with other low shrubby species such as Olearia axillaris, Lomandra maritima and Scaevola crassifolia. A. truncata requires some protection from strong winds. It is tolerant of frost and salt water spray making it ideal for coastal gardens.

See also
List of Acacia species

References

truncata
Acacias of Western Australia
Fabales of Australia
Plants described in 1824
Taxa named by Nicolaas Laurens Burman